Cyanopepla lystra is a moth of the subfamily Arctiinae. It was described by Herbert Druce in 1896. It is found in Colombia.

References

Cyanopepla
Moths described in 1896